Farmington is an unincorporated community in Atchison County, Kansas, United States.

History
Farmington had its start by the building of the Missouri Pacific Railroad through that territory.

The post office was opened in 1868, and remained in operation until it was discontinued in 1940.

Notable people
 Pardee Butler - Free-State advocate, abolitionist, preacher
 Milo Hastings - Inventor

References

Further reading

External links
 Atchison County maps: Current, Historic, KDOT

Unincorporated communities in Atchison County, Kansas
Unincorporated communities in Kansas
1868 establishments in Kansas
Populated places established in 1868